Snellenia hylaea is a species of moth of the Stathmopodidae family. It was described by Turner in 1913. It is found in New South Wales and Queensland.

References

Moths described in 1913
Stathmopodidae